The Queensland Children's Hospital (QCH) is a public children's hospital on Stanley Street in South Brisbane, Queensland, Australia. QCH is the primary facility of Children's Health Queensland, the state-wide Hospital and Health Service that provides specialist paediatric services, and the only hospital completely dedicated to paediatrics in Queensland. QCH has an emergency department, intensive and critical care unit, as well as specialist general medical and surgical services. Children's Health Queensland also provides clinicians and support staff to other hospitals, gives facilities access to paediatric specialists via telehealth, and local programs such as Child and Youth Mental Health Services (CYMHS).

The Queensland Children's Hospital is categorised as a level six service under the Clinical Services Capability Framework 2014. This means it is responsible for providing general paediatric health services to children and young people in the greater Brisbane metropolitan area, as well as tertiary-level care.

The hospital employs more than 2,500 staff from a range of disciplines. In the first year of operations, QCH admitted almost 38,000 patients, saw 63,634 emergency presentations, performed 14,113 operations and provided 188,765 specialist outpatient appointments.

History
QCH was opened as the Lady Cilento Children's Hospital on 29 November 2014. The concept of a single specialist paediatric hospital for Brisbane was a key recommendation to come from a task force commissioned to examine Queensland paediatric cardiac services in 2006. The Queensland Government assembled the taskforce in light of the Mellis Review, which found the model of paediatric care at the time was fragmented, unsustainable, and all services should be consolidated into a single children’s hospital. QCH combined the former Royal Children's Hospital, Mater Children's Hospital, and pediatric cardiac services at The Prince Charles Hospital into one new facility at an estimated construction cost of A$1.2 billion. The 12-level facility represents the largest capital investment in children's health services in Queensland's history.

Hospital name

During the early stages of the project, the hospital was known as the Queensland Children's Hospital. On 15 December 2013, the then Queensland Premier Campbell Newman announced that the hospital would be named after controversial Queensland clinician Lady Phyllis Cilento.

On 21 September 2018, health minister Steven Miles announced that the hospital would revert to its original name of Queensland Children's Hospital, after staff petitioned the Queensland government to change the name to a more "conventional" one, which the hospital's foundation said would secure more money from overseas donors. Miles claimed that an online poll showed strong support for the name change, but it was later revealed that many votes for the name change came from a small number of government IP addresses, suggesting there might have been an attempt by the government to rig the vote. Miles was referred to the Queensland Crime and Corruption Commission (CCC) in relation to the poll. On 13 December 2018 workers began removing the words Lady Cilento from the sign on the building.

Education and research 
The Queensland Children's Hospital is a centre for teaching and research. It provids undergraduate-, postgraduate- and practitioner-level training in paediatric medicine, nursing and allied health. It also plays a role in medical research, undertaking research programs with affiliated universities including The University of Queensland and Queensland University of Technology. It is co-located with the $134 million Centre for Children's Health Research, officially opened on 27 November 2015.

The nine-level centre houses wet and dry laboratories, pathology services, a gait laboratory, a nutrition laboratory, and the Queensland Children's Tumour Bank (funded by the Children's Hospital Foundation) which provides a tissue repository for national and international cancer research.

Design 

The Queensland Children's Hospital was designed by architects Conrad Gargett Lyons. Based on the concept of a ‘living tree’, the building features a network of trunks and branches running throughout, leading to several outdoor gardens, terraces that fill the hospital with as much natural light as possible.

The building design has received a number of awards including the 2015 Queensland State Architecture Awards the F.D.G Stanley Award for Public Architecture and the Karl Langer Award for Urban Design from the Australian Institute of Architects.

At the 2015 Design and Health International Academy Awards, the Hospital design was awarded as the overall winner for Salutogenic Design Project for Healthcare Environment. In addition it was awarded Highly Commended for International Health Project over 40,000m2. Interior Design Project, Use of Art in Public and Private Spaces.

Schooling 
The hospital provides educational programs to students from prep to year 12 for inpatients, outpatients and family members of hospitalised patients in a number of settings and locations across the hospital community. The intention is that (where medically possible) children are able to continue their schooling while being treated at the hospital.

See also

 List of hospitals in Queensland
 List of hospitals in Australia
 List of children's hospitals
 Healthcare in Australia

References

External links

 
 

Children's hospitals in Australia
Hospitals in Brisbane
Hospitals established in 2014
2014 establishments in Australia